Alope was a town of the Ozolian Locrians of uncertain site. Its exact location is not known with certainty. Strabo only locates it in Ozolian Locris and distinguishes it from two other towns with the same name, one in the area of the Opuntian Locris and another in Achaea Phthiotis. He adds that this city was a colony of the one in Opuntian Locris.

Thucydides writes that during the Peloponnesian War, in the year 426 BCE, the Alopians, along with other cities of the Ozolian Locris had to provide hostages to the Spartans. It has been suggested that the name of Olopians may have been an error and in fact it would have referred to the Alpians, which would be the inhabitants of a city that was named Alpa.

References 

Populated places in Ozolian Locris
Cities in ancient Greece
Former populated places in Greece
Lost ancient cities and towns